Edgars Masaļskis (born 31 March 1980) is a Latvian ice hockey coach and former player. Playing as a goaltender, Masaļskis represented the Latvian national team, and has played for a number of clubs, with five seasons in Liepājas Metalurgs as his longest stay at any club. He retired after the 2016–17 season, and joined Dinamo Riga's coaching staff on 2 October 2017.

International play
Masaļskis has played twelve World Hockey Championships, four Winter Olympic Games tournaments and two World Junior Hockey Championships tournaments.

He was named to the Latvia men's national ice hockey team for competition at the 2014 IIHF World Championship.

References

External links
 
 
 
 

1980 births
Living people
Dinamo Riga players
EHC Freiburg players
Expatriate ice hockey players in Russia
Füchse Duisburg players
HC Ambrì-Piotta players
HC Dukla Jihlava players
HC Karlovy Vary players
HC Lada Togliatti players
HC Sibir Novosibirsk players
HC Yugra players
HK Poprad players
HK Riga 2000 players
HK Liepājas Metalurgs players
Ice hockey players at the 2006 Winter Olympics
Ice hockey players at the 2010 Winter Olympics
Ice hockey players at the 2014 Winter Olympics
Latvian ice hockey goaltenders
Metallurg Zhlobin players
Olympic ice hockey players of Latvia
Ice hockey people from Riga
Latvian expatriate sportspeople in Russia
Latvian expatriate sportspeople in Sweden
Latvian expatriate sportspeople in the Czech Republic
Latvian expatriate sportspeople in Germany
Latvian expatriate sportspeople in Slovakia
Latvian expatriate sportspeople in Belarus
Latvian expatriate sportspeople in Switzerland
Expatriate ice hockey players in Sweden
Expatriate ice hockey players in the Czech Republic
Expatriate ice hockey players in Germany
Expatriate ice hockey players in Slovakia
Expatriate ice hockey players in Belarus
Expatriate ice hockey players in Switzerland
Latvian expatriate ice hockey people